The Campionato Italiano di Gruppo 6, (Italian Championship Group 6), was a domestic championship which took place in Italy for Group 6 and also featured cars that were eligible for World Sportscar Championship when races were shared.

References

 
Sports car racing series
Auto racing series in Italy
Group 6 (racing)
1976 establishments in Italy
1983 disestablishments in Italy
Recurring sporting events established in 1976
Recurring sporting events disestablished in 1983